The 2013–14 Segunda División B season was the 37th since its establishment. The first matches of the season were played on 25 August 2013, and the season ended on 22 June 2014 with the promotion play-off finals.

Summary before the 2013–14 season 
Playoffs de Ascenso:

 CD Tenerife (P)
 CD Leganés
 Real Oviedo
 Caudal Deportivo
 Deportivo Alavés (P)
 SD Eibar (P)
 Bilbao Athletic
 Lleida Esportiu
 CE L'Hospitalet
 Huracán Valencia CF
 Levante UD B
 CD Alcoyano
 Real Jaén (P)
 FC Cartagena
 Albacete Balompié
 Lucena CF

Relegated from Segunda División:

 CD Guadalajara
 Racing de Santander
 SD Huesca
 Xerez CD

Promoted from Tercera División:

 Racing de Ferrol (from Group 1)
 Elche CF Ilicitano (from Group 6)
 CD Puerta Bonita (from Group 7)
 Burgos CF (from Group 8)
 Algeciras CF (from Group 10)
 UD Las Palmas Atlético (from Group 12)
 La Hoya Lorca CF (from Group 13)
 CD Sariñena (from Group 17)
 CD Toledo (from Group 18)
 Celta de Vigo B (from Group 1)
 SD Compostela (from Group 1)
 CD Tropezón (from Group 3)
 CD Laudio (from Group 4)
 UE Olot (from Group 5)
 Cultural y Deportiva Leonesa (from Group 8)
 CD El Palo (from Group 9)
 Granada CF B (from Group 9)
 UB Conquense (from Group 18)

Relegated:

 UD San Sebastián de los Reyes (to 3ª Group 7)
 RSD Alcalá (to 3ª Group 7)
 Rayo Vallecano B (to 3ª Group 7)
 CD Marino (to 3ª Group 12)
 Real Zaragoza B (to 3ª Group 17)
 Racing de Santander B (to 3ª Group 3)
 CD Teruel (to 3ª Group 17)
 CA Osasuna B (to 3ª Group 15)
 CD Izarra (to 3ª Group 15)
 CE Constància (relegation revoked)
 RCD Mallorca B (to 3ª Group 11)
 Orihuela CF (to 3ª Group 6)
 Yeclano Deportivo (to 3ª Group 13)
 CD Binissalem (to 3ª Group 11)
 CF Villanovense (to 3ª Group 14)
 UCAM Murcia CF (to 3ª Group 13)
 Loja CD (to 3ª Group 9)
 CD San Roque de Lepe (to 3ª Group 10)
 Real Betis B (to 3ª Group 10)

Dissolved teams and administrative relegations:
 UD Salamanca (dissolved)
 Gimnástica de Torrelavega (administrative relegated)
 Xerez CD (administrative relegated)

Teams covered vacant places by dissolved teams and administrative relegations:
 CE Constància
 Córdoba B
 Team #20

Groups

Group I

 Avilés
 Burgos
 Caudal de Mieres
 Celta de Vigo B
 Compostela
 Coruxo
 Cultural Leonesa
 Guijuelo
 SD Logroñés
 UD Logroñés
 Marino de Luanco
 Noja
 Ourense
 Racing de Ferrol
 Racing de Santander
 Real Oviedo
 Sporting de Gijón B
 Tropezón
 Zamora

Place number 20 in Group 1 was initially reserved for new creation team Salamanca Athletic, but finally did not register.

Group II

 Amorebieta
 Atlético Madrid B
 Barakaldo
 Bilbao Athletic
 Conquense
 Fuenlabrada
 Getafe B
 Huesca
 Las Palmas Atlético
 Laudio
 Leganés
 Peña Sport
 Puerta Bonita
 Real Madrid C
 Real Sociedad B
 Real Unión
 CD Sariñena
 Sestao River
 Toledo
 Tudelano

Group III

 Alcoyano
 At. Baleares
 Badalona
 Constància
 Elche Ilicitano
 Espanyol B
 Gimnàstic de Tarragona
 Huracán Valencia
 L'Hospitalet
 Levante B
 Llagostera
 Lleida Esportiu
 Olímpic Xàtiva
 Ontinyent
 Olot
 Prat
 Reus Deportiu
 Sant Andreu
 Valencia Mestalla
 Villarreal B

Group IV

 Albacete
 Algeciras
 Almería B
 Arroyo
 At. Sanluqueño
 Cacereño
 Cádiz
 Cartagena
 Córdoba B
 Écija
 El Palo
 Granada B
 Guadalajara
 La Hoya Lorca
 La Roda
 Linense
 Lucena
 Melilla
 San Fernando
 Sevilla Atlético

Group 1

Stadia and locations

League table

Results

Top goalscorers
Last updated 11 May 2014

Top goalkeepers
Last updated 11 May 2014

Group 2

Stadia and locations

League table

Results

Top goalscorers
Last updated 11 May 2014

Top goalkeepers
Last updated 11 May 2014

Group 3

Stadia and locations

League table

Results

Top goalscorers
Last updated 11 May 2014

Top goalkeepers
Last updated 11 May 2014

Group 4

Stadia and locations

League table

Results

Top goalscorers
Last updated 11 May 2014

Top goalkeepers
Last updated 11 May 2014

See also
 2013–14 Segunda División
 2014 Segunda División B play-offs
 2013–14 Tercera División
 2013–14 Copa del Rey

References

External links
Royal Spanish Football Federation

 

 
2013-14
3
Spain